Dar al-Islam is the title of a French-language online magazine produced by the Islamic State (IS) between 2014 and 2016. It included articles praising terrorist attacks in France, such as the 2016 Nice truck attack and the January 2015 Île-de-France attacks.

As of late 2016, Dar al-Islam had apparently been supplanted by Rumiyah. The magazine's ten editions were released in total and project jihadology.net has unaltered versions that are available online.

See also

Dabiq (magazine)
Konstantiniyye (magazine)
Rumiyah (magazine)
Istok (magazine)

References

Defunct political magazines
French-language magazines
Islamic State of Iraq and the Levant mass media
Islamic magazines
Magazines established in 2014
Magazines disestablished in 2016
Online magazines
Propaganda newspapers and magazines
Irregularly published magazines